Tibellus vitilis, is a species of spider of the genus Tibellus. It is found only in India and Sri Lanka.

See also
 List of Philodromidae species

References

Philodromidae
Spiders of the Indian subcontinent
Spiders of Asia
Spiders described in 1906